Belče is a village in the municipality of Demir Hisar, North Macedonia.

Demographics
According to the 2002 census, the village had a total of 245 inhabitants. Ethnic groups in the village include:

Macedonians 245

References

Villages in Demir Hisar Municipality